Guinle is a surname. Notable people with the surname include:

Christiana Guinle (born 1965), Brazilian actress and producer
Eduardo Palassin Guinle (1846–1912), Brazilian businessman
Jorge Guinle (1916–2004), Brazilian billionaire
Marcelo Guinle (1947–2017), Argentine politician